The Dolichomacrostomidae are a family of small basal free-living flatworms (Macrostomida, Turbellaria, Platyhelminthes), and members of the marine, but also brackish, meiobenthos. The name was coined by Reinhard M. Rieger (1971), who designated the Dolichomacrostomidae as a family within the taxon Macrostomida. There are currently about 40 named species in this family.

Description 
For the diagnosis of the Dolichomacrostomidae see  and

Ecology and distribution 
The Dolichomacrostomidae are all members of the meiobenthos. Moreover, they are primarily marine, with some forms entering brackish habitats. Many forms are particularly abundant in the subtidal meiobenthos, but here are also intertidal and a few deep-sea forms. Dolichomacrostomidae can be found in all major oceans worldwide, but many areas have been very poorly studied to date.

Reproduction 
Like almost all Platyhelminthes the Dolichomacrostomidae are simultaneous hermaphrodites. They are remarkable for the high complexity of their genitalia. The male copulatory organ often consists of two parts, a glandular and a penis stylet. The former only transfers glandular secretions and the latter both sperm and glandular products. The female genitalia are often associated with sclerotized valve structures of unknown function.

References

External links 
 urbellarian Taxonomic Database: A listing of the taxonomy of turbellarians
 Taxonomy and Phylogeny EDIT Scratchpad

Turbellaria